Arcade  is an unincorporated inhabited place in Ector County, Texas, United States. According to the Handbook of Texas, Arcade was shown on 1936 highway maps as a stop on the Texas and Pacific Railway (later the Missouri Pacific line) and still appears on Ector County maps today. No population statistics were available.

References

External links
 

Unincorporated communities in Ector County, Texas
Unincorporated communities in Texas